Three Mile Plains is a small community in the Canadian province of Nova Scotia, located in  The Municipality of the District of West Hants in Hants County.

Description 

Three Mile Plains, along with Five Mile Plains, was originally inhabited by African-American settlers who called it Windsor Plains. The community was also once called Seven Mile Plains.

Three Mile Plains contains two churches, Windsor Plains Baptist Church and the Anglican Parish of Avon Valley. It also has an elementary school for grades primary-5 as well as a community hall.  Major roads includes Panuke Road, Old Halifax Road,Three Mile Plains Crossroads, Mountain Road, Windsor Back Road, and Trunk 1.

Schools

Three Mile Plains District School
The current elementary school, Three Mile Plains District School, opened in 1963 with an initial enrollment of 300 students, which included children from Three Mile Plains and Five Mile Plains. The school was overcrowded and had to use the community centre to help accommodate the number of students. In the 1980s the school’s population started to decline because of a shrinking population in Three Mile Plains. In the 1990s the special education program closed, and the enrollment numbers fell again. In 2005, the school had an enrollment of 132 students; by 2007 it had risen to 160.

Five Mile Plains School 
Five Mile Plains School was erected in 1945 and it became integrated in 1963. It was a one room school house for elementary students. Although this building isn’t used as an elementary school anymore it still stands and after the school closed it was briefly used as a community hall. Five Mile Plains had goals for students: “Respect Your Heritage, Respect Yourself, Respect Your Family”. They also had an anthem:

     Cheer, Cheer, for old Five Mile Plains
     Wake up the Anthem, Cheer in its name.
     Lend your voices, cheer on high
     Shake down the thunder from the sky.
     What tough the odds, be great or small
     Old Five Mile Plains will win over all.
     Like our, loyal sons,
     We’re marching onward to victory!

Notable residents 

 Dr George Elliot Clarke: Professor at the University of Toronto and a poet of African Canadian literature; recipient of the 2001 Governor General's Award for Poetry for his work Execution Poems.
 Ted Upshaw: first Black member of the Royal Canadian Mounted Police to be promoted to Inspector.
 Clyde Gray: professional boxer; Commonwealth Boxing Council welterweight champion in the 1970s.

References

Communities in Hants County, Nova Scotia